JA Hiroshimabyoin-mae is a Hiroden station on Hiroden Miyajima Line, located in front of JA Hiroshima Kōseiren Hiroshima General Hospital, in Jigozen, Hatsukaichi, Hiroshima.

Routes
From JA Hiroshimabyoin-mae Station, there is one of Hiroden Streetcar routes.
 Hiroshima Station - Hiroden-miyajima-guchi Route

Connections
█ Miyajima Line

Miyauchi — JA Hiroshimabyoin-mae — Jigozen

Around station
JA Hiroshima Kōseiren Hiroshima General Hospital

History
Opened on September 1, 1998.

See also
Hiroden Streetcar Lines and Routes

References

Hiroden Miyajima Line stations
Railway stations in Japan opened in 1998